Statistics of Primera Divisió for the 1997–98 season.

Overview
It was contested by 11 teams, and Principat won the championship.

League table

Results

References
Andorra - List of final tables (RSSSF)

Primera Divisió seasons
Andorra
1997–98 in Andorran football